Sir Frederick Norton Kay Menzies KBE FRSE FRCP LLD (2 November 1875 – 14 May 1949) was a British physician and public health expert. He was Honorary Physician to King George VI.

Life
He was born in Caernarvon on 2 November 1875, the son of Edith Madeline Kay and her husband, John Menzies, a civil engineer. He was educated at Llandovery College then studied medicine at the University of Edinburgh graduating with an MB ChB in 1899. He then undertook postgraduate studies in both Berlin and Vienna returning to work at Edinburgh Royal Infirmary, receiving his doctorate (MD) in 1903. He moved on to Great Ormond Street Hospital in London then Brompton Hospital and the Western Fever Hospital.

In 1907 he became a Demonstrator in Public Health at University College, London under Prof Henry Richard Kenwood also becoming Kenwood's deputy as Medical Officer of Health for the Stoke Newington district. In 1920 he became Medical Officer of Health for London County Council. He introduced medical schemes for London schools, a general screening of the population for tuberculosis, and various centres to treat venereal disease.

In 1924 he gave up all academic roles to focus on his practical roles, becoming Director of Medical Services for the London area. He was also placed in charge of the British Red Cross Society.

In 1927 he was elected a Fellow of the Royal Society of Edinburgh. His proposers were Sir George Newman, Sir Robert William Philip, Edwin Bramwell, James Lorrain Smith and James Hartley Ashworth.

In the Second World War he co-ordinated Red Cross Hospitals in North Wales.

He was made a Knight of the Order of the British Empire by King George V in 1932. He also received the Order of St John of Jerusalem in 1934.

He died in London on 14 May 1949 following a business trip to Port Said.

Family

He was married to Harriet May Lloyd, and together they had one daughter, Jean Valence, and  two sons, Derek and Ian Robert. Derek was a Major in the Royal Welch Fusiliers, and was recorded missing in action in Normandy on 10 June 1944. Jean Valence Menzies died on 6 December 2019, aged 101 years and two months.

References

1875 births
1949 deaths
20th-century Welsh medical doctors
Alumni of the University of Edinburgh
Fellows of the Royal Society of Edinburgh